AUI may stand for:

 Ethernet's Attachment Unit Interface, a 15-pin D-connector
 aUI (constructed language), a constructed language
 The ICAO code for Ukraine International Airlines, Ukraine
 The National Rail code for Ardlui railway station, United Kingdom 
 Associated Universities, Inc., the corporation that operates the National Radio Astronomy Observatory (NRAO)
 Amiga User International, a monthly magazine dedicated to the Amiga computer
 Al Akhawayn University,  a university located in Ifrane, Morocco
 Adaptive user interface
 Audible user interface, for blind people to use digital devices
 Attentive user interface
 Gold monoiodide, chemical formula AuI

See also

 
 
 
 AUIS (disambiguation)